Wallop is a defunct social networking service.

Wallop or Wallops may also refer to:

Places
Farleigh Wallop, a small village and civil parish in Hampshire, England
Middle Wallop, a village in Hampshire, England
Nether Wallop a village in Hampshire, England
Over Wallop, a village in Hampshire, England
Wallops Island, Virginia, USA
 Wallops Island National Wildlife Refuge
Wallops Flight Facility, a rocket launch site

People
Baron Wallop, a subsidiary title of the Earl of Portsmouth

Surnamed
 Douglass Wallop (1920–1985), American novelist and playwright
 Gerard Wallop, 9th Earl of Portsmouth (1898–1984), English aristocrat
 Henry Wallop (c. 1540–1599), English statesman
 John Wallop (c. 1490–1551), English soldier and diplomat
 John Wallop (died 1405), MP for Salisbury
 John Wallop, 1st Earl of Portsmouth (1690–1762), English aristocrat
 John Wallop, 2nd Earl of Portsmouth (1742–1797), English aristocrat
 John Wallop, 3rd Earl of Portsmouth (1767–1853), English aristocrat
 Malcolm Wallop (1933–2011), Republican politician and United States Senator from Wyoming
 Newton Wallop, 6th Earl of Portsmouth (1856–1917), English aristocrat
 Robert Wallop (1601–1667), English politician, regicide of King Charles I

Other uses
Wallop (album), a 2019 album by !!!
The Wallop, 1921 film starring Harry Carey
WALLOPS, an Internet Relay Chat command

See also